Madame Bo-Peep is a 1917 American silent comedy film directed by Chester Withey and starring Seena Owen, Allan Sears, and F.A. Turner. It is based on the short story "Madame Bo-Peep of the Ranches" by O. Henry.

Cast

References

Bibliography
 Goble, Alan. The Complete Index to Literary Sources in Film. Walter de Gruyter, 1999.

External links

1917 films
1917 comedy films
1910s English-language films
American silent feature films
Silent American comedy films
American black-and-white films
Triangle Film Corporation films
Films directed by Chester Withey
1910s American films